Víctor Manuel Cámara Parejo (born June 10, 1959) is a Venezuelan American telenovela, cinema actor and politician.

Early life
Víctor is the son to actress Elisa Parejo and actor Carlos Cámara, both natives of the Dominican Republic. He has a brother named Carlos Cámara Jr. who is also an actor.

He studied Electronic Engineering at the Universidad Central de Venezuela and parallel studies in theater and acting. He began his career helping his grandparents in the theater in both the artistic and technical department.

Career
His acting career in television and cinema began in 1978 when he joined Radio Caracas Televisión. Since then, he has acted in various telenovelas in his home country Venezuela and in Mexico and the United States.

In 2011, he returned to Venezuela to participate in the telenovela Natalia del Mar to portray the villain for the first time ever since the start of his career in telenovelas.

Political career
Cámara is running for a seat in Doral City Council on 2020 election as independent. Also, he announced his intentions to be mayor of the city, and to defeat the incumbent mayor Juan Carlos Bermúdez. Cámara declared that he supported and participated in the campaign of the Democrat Alex Penelas when he ran for mayor of Miami-Dade in 1996.

Personal life
Víctor is married to Ivette Planchard since 14 February 1977. They welcomed their first child, a daughter named Samantha in 1997.

Filmography

Telenovelas

Film
 The Celibacy (2010) as Bruno
 La mujer de coronel (2010)
 El secreto de Jimena (2009) as Adam
 13 segundos (2007) as Dr. Eduardo Valladares
 Rosa de Francia  (1995) as Roberto

References

External links

Victor Camara profile at 
Víctor Cámara facts at 

Living people
Male actors from Caracas
1959 births
Venezuelan male film actors
Venezuelan male telenovela actors
Venezuelan people of Dominican Republic descent